Zhao Yating (born 12 May 2001 in Yuncheng, Shanxi, China) is a Chinese individual rhythmic gymnast.

Career 
Zhao first tried rhythmic gymnastics at age three in Yangquan and began formal training at age six. She was scouted by former gymnast Wu Chuangrong and became member a National Elite Athlete of China in 2016.

As a junior, Zhao won the all-around gold at the 2014 Pacific Rim Championships ahead of Nastasya Generalova of the US. Zhao won gold in hoop, ball and bronze in clubs, ribbon.  She also won bronze in all-around at the 2016 Pacific Rim Championships and took silver medal in ball and clubs.

In 2016, Zhao won the all-around silver medal at the Chinese National Championships. In 2017 Season, Zhao began training with overseas coach Larisa Sidorova who has coached gymnasts such as Varvara Filiou. Zhao competed at the World Cup Series in Pesaro, Italy and Guadalajara, Spain. She won the all-around silver medal at the Chinese National Games behind Shang Rong. On August 30 - September 3, Zhao competed at the 2017 World Championships finishing 21st in the individual all-around finals behind Greece's Eleni Kelaiditi.

In 2018, on April 13–15, Zhao competed at the 2018 Pesaro World Cup finishing 14th in the all-around. On May 11–13, Zhao competed at the 2018 Portimao World Challenge Cup finishing 18th in the all-around.
In 2018, on August 27–28, Zhao competed at the 2018 Jakarta Asian Games. On the 27th, she joined the team and Finishing the fifth place (total: 141.350). 28th, she participated in the individual all-around final and played well to win the bronze medal (total: 65.550 Hoop: 16.400 Ball: 16.400 Clubs: 16.750 Ribbon: 16.000), behind Alina Adilkhanova (Kazakhstan) and Sabina Tashkenbaeva (Uzbekistan).

References

External links 
 
 

2001 births
Living people
Chinese rhythmic gymnasts
People from Yuncheng
Gymnasts at the 2018 Asian Games
Asian Games medalists in gymnastics
Asian Games bronze medalists for China
Medalists at the 2018 Asian Games
Gymnasts from Shanxi
21st-century Chinese women